Raphaël Bérubé, known by his stage name Sir Pathétik, is a Canadian rapper who has released a number of albums and collaborated with many artists, earning several best rapper awards from ADISQ. He started in music 2000 and when he joined the group Chosen One made of Ale Dee and Diapason after departure of Justice J, the group including Sir Pathétik was renamed Mine de rien. He and Ale Dee won the 2nd place of the competition "Hip Hop Forever 2002". After the group split up, Sir Pathétik went solo with a string of albums. He has also collaborated with many artists including Yvon Krevé, 1 Etranjj, l'Queb, Billy Nova, Da Vinci, Striger, Malik Shaheed, Asami and DJ Horg.

Discography
2000: Demo
Intro
Conseil d'un vieille ados
L'accro du trippe
Plein de cernes
2003: 3 ans de trippe après
Intro
Straight up
3 ans de trippe après...
C'Pathétik
T-R City Style
Les mains dans l'dos
Une vie simple
Catch my flow
Ça qu'y'é ça
Ché pas si
Comme je suis
8 mai 1996
Faudrait jamais oublier
L'accroc du trippe
Laisse nous faire
Bad right now
C'pas toujours beau
Même si t'aime pas ça
2005: Un gars d'même
Intro
Skit
Live and crazy
Ça va mal
Besoin d'toi
Catch le vibe
Personne à l'abri
J'ai pas envie
J'entends parler
J'trouve ça plate
Skit
Un gars d'même
Marie-moi
Le party dans la foule
La fille que j'aime
J'pourrais être
Pathétik dans l'stéréo
Skit
J'haïrais pas ça
On s'en calisse
Maman
2006: Comme je suis
Intro
J’ai toute essayé
S’pas normal
Bienvenue dans rue
I feel so crazy (Baby)
Quand je feel ben
C’que tu penses
Long long time
Désolé
Dans le zoo
Juste comme moi
Quand les fils se touchent
T-Town Bwoi
Pour mon pays
Les choses se bousculent
J’aimerais ça te dire
Le monde change
Même si sa dérape
2007: Mauvaize Frékentation
'2 gars
J'rap pour toi
Dream on
Dangerous
Ma chix
Ceux en dedans
Jamais 2
Attendais
The grind
Ca vaut pas la peine
Comme ma dope
Dans ma bulle
A pas oublier
Wanna ride
Apprend à vivre
U don't know the half
Aquarium
Accroc du trip III
2008: Avant k'tu m'oublies

Back Again
Célibataire
La plus cool de la planète
Quand l'ambiance est bonne (feat. Rebel Kulcha Connection)
Rester soi-même (feat. J-Ron)
Protège-toi
Renonce jamais (feat. Longue Distance)
Faut que tu te réveilles avant (feat. Jérome Philippe)
C'est peut-être la bonne
Drôle de passe
J'pense à toi
T'aimes un badboy (feat. Von Von le Vet and 1 Étranjj)
Ça l'existe tu?
I Got Ya Talking (feat. O Eternal, Billy Nova and Jérome)
Comme un cauchemar
Quelqu'un comme moi (feat. Billy Nova)
S'un High
On s'en calisse encore
Cédrika (feat. K2)
Penses-y bien (feat. Jean-François Bastien)
Avant k'tu m'oublies
2009: Toute une Histoire

Drette d'in dents
Aime-moi encore
Famille séparée
Star du rap
Comme les femmes sont belles
La comptine d'la robine
Quand t'as claqué la porte
Prisonnier
Le p'tit Éric
J't'ai failli
Aime-la mieux qu'moi
Take me away
Si loin de moi
Sunshine
Toi et moi
La lune
Ta dernière chanson (feat. Dany Bédar)
2012: Soldat de la musique #32 CAN

Awards and nominations
Sir Pathétik was nominated for "Best Hip Hop Album" at the Gala of ADISQ for three consecutive years:
In 2005 for Sir Pathétik's album  3 ans de trippe après
In 2006 for Sir Pathétik's album Un gars d'même
In 2007 for Sir Pathétik's album Comme je suis
In 2008 he was nominated for 4 awards in Sounds of Blackness Awards in Québec (S.O.B.A) jointly with Billy Nova for:
Best hip hop artist or group francophone
Best French language album
Best artist or group francophone
SOBA Public Choice award

References

External links
Official site
MySpace site

Canadian male rappers
21st-century Canadian rappers
Living people
Musicians from Trois-Rivières
Year of birth missing (living people)
21st-century Canadian male musicians